Northmore is a surname. Notable people with the surname include:

John Northmore (judge), Australian judge
John Northmore (MP) for Taunton (UK Parliament constituency)
Luke Northmore (born 1997), English rugby union player
Ryan Northmore (born 1980), English football goalkeeper
Samuel Northmore (1872–1946), English rugby union player
Thomas Northmore (1766–1851), English writer, inventor and geologist
Thomas Northmore (politician) (c.1643–1713), English barrister and politician
William Northmore (1690–1735), British landowner and politician

See also
Augustus Welby Northmore Pugin (1812–1852), English architect, designer, and theorist of design

English-language surnames